Leghari may refer to:

 Leghari tribe, a Baloch tribe in Pakistan and Iran

People
 Awais Leghari (born 1971), Pakistani politician
 Farooq Leghari (1940–2010), Pakistani politician, President of Pakistan 1993-1997
 Irfan Zafar Leghari (fl. from 2018), Pakistani politician
 Jaffar Khan Leghari (born 1942), Pakistani politician
 Jamal Leghari (fl. 2011), Pakistani politician
 Javaid Laghari, Pakistani academic, author, and politician
 Muhammad Mohsin Khan Leghari (born 1963), Pakistani politician
 Mushtaq Leghari (active 1962–1999), Pakistani Air Force officer and diplomat
 Nadir Laghari, Pakistani politician
 Nazir Leghari (born 1955), Pakistani journalist, writer and news analyst
 Rafique Haider Khan Leghari (born 1951), Pakistani politician
 Rehana Leghari (born 1971), Pakistani politician
 Sajeela Leghari (born 1964), Pakistani politician

See also
 Tuman Leghari, a town and union council of Dera Ghazi Khan District, Punjab province, Pakistan
 

Surnames of Pakistani origin